The commanding general of United States Army Europe and Africa (CG USAREUR-AF) was formerly known as the commander-in-chief of United States Army Europe (CINCUSAREUR).  Prior to 8 May 1945 the official title was Commander, European Theater of Operations, United States Army. From 1953 to 1967 the commanding general of USAREUR was "dual hatted" as commander of the Central Army Group of NATO forces in Germany.  The commanding general of USAREUR is currently "dual hatted" as the commanding general of United States Army Africa.

List of USAREUR Commanders/Commanding Generals

See also 

United States Army Europe
Commanding General, United States Army Pacific

Notes

References 

United States Army organization
Commanding General, Army Europe